is a rural district located in northeastern Aichi Prefecture, Japan.

As of 1 October 2019, the district had an estimated population of 8,595 and a population density of 15.5 persons per km2. Its total area was 554.51 km2.

Towns and villages
There are two towns and one village within the district.
Shitara Town
Tōei Town
Toyone Village

History
Shitara District (設楽郡) was one of the ancient districts of Mikawa province having been created in 903 out of Hoi District (宝飯郡).  In the cadastral reforms of the early Meiji period, on July 22, 1878 Shitara District was divided into Kitashitara District and Minamishitara District. With the organization of municipalities on October 1, 1889, Kitashitara District was divided into 13 villages.

Taguchi Village, the site of the district administrative office, was elevated to town status on October 10, 1900. Hongō Village was elevated to town status on October 1, 1921. On May 10, 1940, the villages of Inahashi and Busetsu merged to form the town of Inabu.
On April 1, 1955 Hongō Town merged with the neighboring villages of Midono, Shimokawa and Sono to form the town of Tōei. The village of Miwa joined the new town the following year, on July 1, 1956. An administrative reorganization later that year left the district with three towns and three villages.

The town of Inabu became part of the now-defunct Higashikamo District on October 1, 2003. (The town was later merged into the city of Toyota on April 1, 2005)

Recent mergers
The village of Tsugu merged with the town of Shitara on October 1, 2005.
The village of Tomiyama was merged into the village of Toyone on November 27, 2005.

External links
From the official history website of Neba village, Nagano Prefecture
Counties of Japan

Districts in Aichi Prefecture